Timaru District is a local government district on New Zealand's South Island, administered by the Timaru District Council. It is part of the larger Canterbury Region.

Geography
The Timaru District is located on the east coast of the South Island and stretches inland as far as the Main Divide. The district has a population of  Timaru is the main town. The next biggest towns in order are Temuka, Geraldine and Pleasant Point. Smaller settlements include Arundel, Cave, Orari and Winchester. The Timaru District Library has branches situated in Timaru, Temuka and Geraldine.

Demographics

Timaru District had a population of 46,296 at the 2018 New Zealand census, an increase of 2,364 people (5.4%) since the 2013 census, and an increase of 3,426 people (8.0%) since the 2006 census. There were 19,119 households. There were 22,812 males and 23,481 females, giving a sex ratio of 0.97 males per female. The median age was 44.8 years (compared with 37.4 years nationally), with 8,289 people (17.9%) aged under 15 years, 7,596 (16.4%) aged 15 to 29, 20,280 (43.8%) aged 30 to 64, and 10,128 (21.9%) aged 65 or older.

Ethnicities were 90.4% European/Pākehā, 9.1% Māori, 1.9% Pacific peoples, 4.4% Asian, and 1.9% other ethnicities. People may identify with more than one ethnicity.

The percentage of people born overseas was 13.4, compared with 27.1% nationally.

Although some people objected to giving their religion, 48.4% had no religion, 40.8% were Christian, 0.7% were Hindu, 0.2% were Muslim, 0.3% were Buddhist and 1.8% had other religions.

Of those at least 15 years old, 4,887 (12.9%) people had a bachelor or higher degree, and 9,597 (25.3%) people had no formal qualifications. The median income was $30,300, compared with $31,800 nationally. 5,415 people (14.2%) earned over $70,000 compared to 17.2% nationally. The employment status of those at least 15 was that 18,456 (48.6%) people were employed full-time, 5,751 (15.1%) were part-time, and 951 (2.5%) were unemployed.

History
Timaru has its origins in a sheep station, The Levels, run by George Rhodes. In 1868, residents petitioned for the town to be established as a borough, and the Timaru Borough Council was proclaimed in 1868.

Economy

Venture Timaru is the regional development and tourism organisation.

References

External links

 Timaru District Council website
 Timaru District Tourism website

 
1989 establishments in New Zealand